Charles Walter Terrell (born May 11, 1958) is a retired Major League Baseball player. A starting pitcher, Terrell pitched from 1982 to 1992 for the New York Mets (1982–1984), Detroit Tigers (1985–1988), San Diego Padres (1989), New York Yankees (1989), Pittsburgh Pirates (1990), and the Tigers (1990–1992).

Career
In 1979, Terrell played collegiate summer baseball for the Chatham A's of the Cape Cod Baseball League (CCBL). He posted a 9-4 record with a 2.20 ERA and 13 complete games. Terrell set the league record for innings pitched in a season, and was named the league's outstanding pitcher. Terrell was inducted into the CCBL Hall of Fame in 2007.

Terrell was traded along with Ron Darling from the Texas Rangers to the Mets for Lee Mazzilli on April 1, 1982.

On August 6, 1983, Terrell hit a two-run home run off future Hall of Famer Ferguson Jenkins of the Chicago Cubs in the third inning, then another two-run homer the very next inning. Jenkins shut down the rest of the offense, but lost the game 4-1. Later that same month, Terrell had another three hits, including a three-run home run. In five years as a hitter, he logged only three home runs and ten runs batted in but all three home runs and seven of the ten RBI came in a seventeen-day span.

Terrell was dealt from the Mets to the Tigers for Howard Johnson at the Winter Meetings on December 7, 1984. Against the California Angels at Tiger Stadium on August 20, 1986, he had a no-hitter broken up with two out in the ninth by a Wally Joyner double. It was the only hit he would allow in a 3-0 Tiger victory. He also surrendered the first of Mark McGwire's 583 home runs on August 25, 1986. He had a career-best 17 wins during the Tigers drive to the 1987 American League East pennant.

Terrell finished with a career mark of 111-124 in 321 games, with a 4.22 all-time ERA. He struck out 929 in 1,986.2 innings pitched.

Although a weak hitting pitcher, posting a .120 batting average (23-for-192) with 3 home runs and 10 RBI, Terrell was an above average fielding pitcher. He recorded a .980 fielding percentage with only 10 errors in 489 total chances and started 38 double plays.

Personal life
Terrell was born in Jeffersonville, Indiana, and attended Morehead State University, where he was a member of the Sigma Alpha Epsilon fraternity. He batted left-handed and threw right-handed. He had 3 children.  Ryan, Michael, and Erin.

References

External links

1958 births
Living people
Chatham Anglers players
Detroit Tigers players
Major League Baseball pitchers
Baseball players from Indiana
Morehead State Eagles baseball players
New York Mets players
New York Yankees players
People from Jeffersonville, Indiana
Pittsburgh Pirates players
San Diego Padres players
Asheville Tourists players
Gulf Coast Rangers players
Lakeland Tigers players
Syracuse Chiefs players
Tidewater Tides players
Tulsa Drillers players